Live at the Royal Albert Hall is a live album by the South African isicathamiya group Ladysmith Black Mambazo. It was recorded in front of a live audience on April 22, 1999, and released simultaneously on videotape and DVD.

Track listing
 "Introduction"
 "Vulan' Amasango (Open the Gates)"
 "Ngamthola (I Found)"
 "Hello My Baby"
 "Abadala"
 "King of Kings" / "Abezizwe (Nations)"
 "Wena Othanda"
 "Inkanyezi Nezazi (The Star and the Wiseman)"
 "Ngothandaza Njalo (I Will Keep On Praying)"
 "Rain, Rain, Beautiful Rain"
 "Phansi Emgodini (Down in the Mines)"
 "Homeless"

See also
 Mango Groove: Live in Concert (2011)

Ladysmith Black Mambazo albums
Live albums recorded at the Royal Albert Hall
1999 live albums
Live albums by South African artists